Collingwood College is a coeducational secondary school and sixth form located in Camberley, Surrey, England.

Admissions
Collingwood is the largest secondary school in Surrey, with over 2,000 students, including more than 400 in the sixth form. It occupies a  campus and is divided in the three main areas 'Kingston' (Years 10 & 11) and 'Barossa' (Years 7–9), and the sixth form centre. This was funded by the sale of land, on which the college's previous sixth form centre (named 'Ballard') was situated. Collingwood College is a DfE designated high-performing specialist academy, specialising in technology and vocational-education.

It is situated just north of the A30, near the Jolly Farmer roundabout on the Old Dean Estate, Camberley.

History

Earlier school
The school derives itself from the Frimley and Camberley County Grammar School, the Bagshot County Secondary School, and the Barossa County Secondary School. In July 1970, Surrey County Council wavered over whether to go ahead with the comprehensive plan.

Comprehensive
The first Headmaster in 1971 was Mr. Leonard Roe, who had previously been Headmaster of the grammar school. He was followed by Peter Halls-Dickerson, who was a major advocate of the idea of direct grant schools. Collingwood was one of the earliest direct grant schools to be created after the passage of the legislation by the then Conservative government. The headmaster from 1974 until the 1990s was Peter Halls-Dickerson.

Grant-maintained and Foundation school
On 1 September 1991, Collingwood School became Collingwood College – a grant-maintained school. This change of status was overwhelmingly supported by the parents. In 1999, under the new schools' framework, the school adopted foundation status.

In September 1994, Collingwood College became a self-governing technology college. Following the new funding, the school built the Halls-Dickerson Technology Centre, also one of the first of its kind. As of 1 April 2008, the college was granted high-performing specialist school status. The school also specialises in vocational education, which provides education for working life; such as hairdressing, building and other manual labour based jobs.

Collingwood is a founding member of the Surrey Heath Area Partnership for Education (SHAPE), Surrey's 14–19 network. SHAPE runs diploma courses in IT, for which Collingwood is the lead school and also Society Health and Development. Diplomas are also offered in business and finance and creative media.

Academy
Previously a foundation school administered by Surrey County Council, in July 2011 Collingwood College converted to academy status.

Catchment
Its catchment area encompasses much of the Surrey Heath area of Camberley, Bagshot, Lightwater, Ascot, Egham, Windlesham, Bisley, Chobham and West End.

Stabbing and slashing incidents
The school appeared in the national press following a November 2005 incident in which a student was repeatedly stabbed with a pair of scissors, including one wound above the eye. A month prior, 12-year-old schoolgirl Shanni Naylor was scarred when another girl slashed her face with a pencil sharpener blade.

The school was also featured on a special programme called "School of Hard Knocks" on ITV that was aired on 6 November 2006. It examined the assault in some detail. It featured an interview with Natashia and her parents, as well as stories from other victims of bullying. The programme publicly criticised the Principal for denying that there was a bullying problem at Collingwood. However, an OFSTED report in 2007 showed that there were no serious problems with bullying at Collingwood College.

A separate stabbing took place at the school by Sharon Carr in 1994 when she was just 14 years old. Carr used a knife to stab fellow pupil Ann-Marie Clifford, who survived. However, it later came to light that Carr was responsible for the murder of a local hairdresser two years before. Carr is the youngest female to be convicted of murder in the UK.

Collingwood College Productions
Every year Collingwood Productions stage their annual musical. The productions are auditioned in the first two weeks of December, allowing the principals to get to grips with their parts over the holidays. They then return in January to begin the rehearsal process. After the two and a half-month period the shows are staged around the last week of March and normally run for four nights, Wednesday to Saturday.

As of 2020 due to Coronavirus, the annual productions have been paused just a week before Legally Blonde was due to hit the stage.

Teaching
Due to the huge number of students at Collingwood, the school is very organised in its hierarchy of staff. Each year has a Head of Year and Pastoral Assistant, who move up with the students through their years at the school. Also, each assistant principal is assigned to a year, to take care of other pastoral issues.

All subjects that are taught at the school are assigned a faculty, where the faculty head assists with the running of the subjects, and provides behavioural support to the teachers in their faculty.

Sixth Form Centre
The sixth form was originally housed in the "Ballard" building. Before becoming part of Collingwood School, it had been built for Cordwalles/Cordwallis Boys School, then taken over during the Second World War as Cordwallis MT [Motor Transport] Training Centre for the Auxiliary Territorial Service. It was at this site that Princess Elizabeth trained to drive an Austin K2/Y ambulance as a subaltern. After the war, the building was taken over by the independent Great Ballard School, who occupied it until the 1960s.

In 2005, a new Sixth Form Centre was officially opened by the Countess of Wessex. The Ballard building and its surrounding land was sold, and it was subsequently demolished to be replaced by housing.

The Sixth Form Centre features an extremely modernised architecture, a series of seven small IT classrooms plus one large computer suite on the top floor. The centre provides facilities for sixth form students such as a common room and private study area.

Academic performance
Collingwood performs consistently above both the LEA (Surrey) and national average at both GCSE and A-Level.

Notable alumni
 Steve Backshall, climber and naturalist.
 Clare Burrage, particle physicist
 Sharon Carr, youngest female killer in Britain, stabbed a fellow pupil at the school in June 1994.
 Dan Frazier, professional rugby player for Newcastle Falcons in RFU Premiership.
 Matt Goss, part of the 1980s pop band, Bros
 Luke Goss, part of the 1980s pop band, Bros
 Jessica Henwick, actress
 Craig Logan, part of the 1980s pop band, Bros
 George Saville, footballer

Notes

External links
School website

Academies in Surrey
Educational institutions established in 1971
Camberley
Secondary schools in Surrey
1971 establishments in England
Specialist applied learning colleges in England
Specialist technology colleges in England